George I. Clem (September 26, 1910 – December 19, 1988) was an American politician and businessman.

Born in Fairmont, Minnesota, Clem was a high school principal and insurance agency member. He graduated from what is now Eastern Michigan University in Ypsilanti, Michigan. Clem served in the Minnesota House of Representatives in 1947.

Notes

1910 births
1995 deaths
People from Fairmont, Minnesota
People from Pine City, Minnesota
Eastern Michigan University alumni
Businesspeople from Minnesota
Members of the Minnesota House of Representatives
20th-century American politicians
20th-century American businesspeople